Joaquin (Quin) Mazdak Luttinger (December 2, 1923 – April 6, 1997) was an American physicist well known for his contributions to the theory of interacting electrons in one-dimensional metals (the electrons in these metals are said to be in a Luttinger-liquid state) and the Fermi-liquid theory. He received his BS and PhD in physics from MIT in 1947. His brother was the physical chemist Lionel Luttinger (1920–2009) and his nephew is the mathematician Karl Murad Luttinger (born 1961).

See also
 Negative mass
 Schrieffer–Wolff transformation
 Wiener sausage
 Fermi liquid
 Many-body problem
 Anomalous magnetic moment
 Effective mass theory
 k·p perturbation theory

Notes

Some publications
(Note: For a complete list, see J. Stat. Phys. 103, 641 (2001).)
 W. Kohn, and J. M. Luttinger, Quantum Theory of Electrical Transport Phenomena, Physical Review, Vol. 108, pp. 590–611 (1957). APS
 W. Kohn, and J. M. Luttinger, Quantum Theory of Electrical Transport Phenomena. II, Physical Review, Vol. 109, pp. 1892–1909 (1958). APS
 J. M. Luttinger, Theory of the Hall Effect in Ferromagnetic Substances, Physical Review, Vol. 112, pp. 739–751 (1958). APS
 W. Kohn, and J. M. Luttinger, Ground-State Energy of a Many-Fermion System, Physical Review, Vol. 118, pp. 41–45 (1960). APS
 J. M. Luttinger, and J. C. Ward, Ground-State Energy of a Many-Fermion System. II, Physical Review, Vol. 118, pp. 1417–1427 (1960). APS
 J. M. Luttinger, Fermi Surface and Some Simple Equilibrium Properties of a System of Interacting Fermions, Physical Review, Vol. 119, pp. 1153–1163 (1960). APS
 J. M. Luttinger, Analytic Properties of Single-Particle Propagators for Many-Fermion Systems, Physical Review, Vol. 121, pp. 942–949 (1961). APS
 J. M. Luttinger, Theory of the de Hass-van Alphen Effect for a System of Interacting Fermions, Physical Review, Vol. 121, pp. 1251–1258 (1961). APS
 J. M. Luttinger, Derivation of the Landau Theory of Fermi Liquids. I. Formal Properties, Physical Review, Vol. 127, pp. 1423–1431 (1962). APS
 J. M. Luttinger, Derivation of the Landau Theory of Fermi Liquids. II. Equilibrium Properties and Transport Equation, Physical Review, Vol. 127, pp. 1431–1440 (1962). APS
 J. M. Luttinger, An exactly solvable model of a many-fermion system, Journal of Mathematical Physics, Vol. 4, No. 9, pp. 1154–1162 (1963). 
 W. Kohn, and J. M. Luttinger, New Mechanism for Superconductivity, Physical Review Letters, Vol. 15, No. 12, pp. 524–526 (1965). APS
 R. Friedberg, and J. M. Luttinger, Density of electronic energy levels in disordered systems, Physical Review B, Vol. 12, pp. 4460–4474 (1975). APS
 J. M. Luttinger, Density of electronic energy levels in disordered systems. II, Physical Review B, Vol. 13, pp. 2596–2600 (1976). APS
 R. Tao, and J. M. Luttinger, Exact evaluation of Green's functions for a class of one-dimensional disordered systems, Physical Review B, Vol. 27, pp. 935–944 (1983). APS

Obituary
 Philip W. Anderson, Richard M. Friedberg, and Walter Kohn, Joaquin M. Luttinger, Physics Today, December 1997, pp. 89–90 (PDF). Note: This obituary is reprinted with permission in Journal of Statistical Physics, Vol. 103, Nos. 3/4, pp. 413–415 (2001) (Link).

External links
 Photograph of J.M. Luttinger: .
 Robert Nelson, Leading Physicist Joaquin Luttinger, 73, April 18, 1997, Columbia University, New York,  .
 Walter Kohn, "Joaquin M. Luttinger", Biographical Memoirs of the National Academy of Sciences (2014)

1923 births
1997 deaths
MIT Department of Physics alumni
Theoretical physicists
University of Michigan faculty
Fellows of the American Physical Society